Randy Rogers Band is the sixth album released by the Randy Rogers Band, an American country music group. This is their second album on a major label. "In My Arms Instead" was the first single released from the album; it entered the Billboard Hot Country Songs chart at #58.

Track listing
"Wicked Ways" (Jon Richardson) - 4:20
"Better Than I Ought To Be" (Gary Nicholson, Randy Rogers) - 2:51  
"Lonely Too Long" (George Ducas, Rogers) - 3:19
"One Woman" (Rogers, Stephony Smith) - 4:05
"Never Be That High" (Rogers, Smith) - 3:42
"Didn't Know You Could" (Micky Braun, Rogers) - 3:58
"In My Arms Instead" (Sean McConnell, Rogers) 5:18
"When The Circus Leaves Town" (Clint Ingersoll, Jon Richardson, Rogers) - 4:22
"Buy Myself A Chance" (McConnell, Rogers) - 3:41
"Break Even" (Geoffrey Hill) - 4:58
"Let It Go" (Radney Foster, Rogers) - 3:32
"This Is Goodbye" (Ingersoll, Heather Morgan) - 3:25

Personnel

Randy Rogers Band
 Brady Black - fiddle, background vocals
 Geoffrey Hill - electric guitar, background vocals
 Les Lawless - drums
 Jon Richardson - bass guitar
 Randy Rogers - acoustic guitar, lead vocals

Additional Musicians
 Jessi Alexander - background vocals
 Eric Borash - dobro, acoustic guitar, baritone guitar, electric guitar, lap steel guitar, mandolin
 Todd Cooper - background vocals
 Clayton E. Corn - Hammond B-3 organ, keyboards, Wurlitzer
 Radney Foster - acoustic guitar, electric guitar
 Craig Krampf - percussion
 Sean McConnell - background vocals
 Jon Randall - background vocals

Chart performance

References

2008 albums
Mercury Nashville albums
Randy Rogers Band albums